Greater Newport Rural Historic District is a national historic district located near Newport, Giles County, Virginia. It encompasses a total of 737 contributing buildings and 25 contributing structures in the rural area near the village of Newport. It encompasses the previously listed Newport Historic District. The district includes primarily 19th- and early-20th-century farmsteads and complexes. Notable buildings include the "Camper" Cabin (late 18th century), Albert Meredith Cabin (c. 1840), E. L. Lucas House (c. 1850), Moses Atkins House (1837), William Lafon House (1855), Doak Lucas House (1860), Leonard Kessinger House (1871), Martin Farrier House (1905), Steve and Lori Taylor House (1938), Upper Spruce Run School (1890), Clover Hollow Christian Church (1921), Sherry Memorial Church, Old Cook Mill (c. 1910), three standing diminutive Burr covered bridges, a smelting furnace (1871), the Mountain Lake Hotel Resort, and the Biological Station of the University of Virginia (1934).

It was listed on the National Register of Historic Places in 2000.

References

Historic districts on the National Register of Historic Places in Virginia
Buildings and structures in Giles County, Virginia
National Register of Historic Places in Giles County, Virginia